Chandranath Mishra Amar (2 March 1925 – 1 April 2021) was a Maithili writer and poet. He was the recipient of the Sahitya Akademi award for his 1982 work Maithili Patrakaritak Itahas. He also won the prestigious Sahitya Akademi Fellowship for the year 2010.

Honours and awards
Founder Secretary, Navratna Gosthi, Darbhanga (1943) 
General Secretary, All India Maithili Sahitya Parishad (1957)
Language Director and Actor in First Maithili film Kanyadan directed by Phani Majumdar (1964)
Member, Senate, KSDS University, Darbhanga (1982) 
Sahitya Akademi Award for Maithili Patrakaritak Itihas (1983)
Member, Maithili Language Advisory Board, Sahitya Akademi, New Delhi (1983)
Member, Executive Committee, Maithili Academy Patna (1988)
Member, Programme Advisory Committee, All India Radio, Darbhanga (1993)
Sahitya Akademi Translation Award for Parashuramak Bichhal Berayal Katha (1998)
Convenor, Maithili Advisory Board Sahitya Akademi, New Delhi (2003)
Sahitya Akademi Fellowship (2010)

List of works
Poetry
Gudgudi (1946)
Yugachakra (1952)
Ritupriya (1963)
Unta Pal (1972)
Asha-Disha (1975)
Thahi-Pathahi (2001)

Novel, Short-Story & Criticism
Veer Kanya (1950)
Bidagari (1963)
Jasamadhi (1972)
M. M. Muralidhar Jha (1980)
Kashikant Mishra 'Madhup'(1994)
Dinanath Pathak Bandhu (1994)
 Zero Power (2006)

One-Act Play
Samadhan (1995)
Khajwa Topi (2005)

Memoir
Kanyadan Filmak: Nepathya Katha (2003)

Miscellaneous
Trifla (1948)
Maithili Patrikaritak Itihas (1981)
Swatantra Swar (1994)
Parashuramak Bichhal Berayal Katha (1995)
Maithili Sahitya Parishadak Itihas (1995)
Maithili Mahasabhak Itihas (1995)

Translation
Vidyapati Sukti Taranginee
Bankim Chandra Chatterjee
H. N. Apte

Editing
Lok Sahitya (Research Papers)(2006)
Maithili Ragmanch (Research Papers)(2007)
Jagle Rahbai (Poetry) (2007)
Labani Parak Deep (Poetry)
Sandhi Samas (Short Story)
Katha Kislay (2007)

References

1925 births
2021 deaths
Indian writers
Indian poets
Maithili writers
Maithili poets
Recipients of the Sahitya Akademi Award in Maithili
Recipients of the Sahitya Akademi Fellowship